Bluesmart Inc. was a global travel technology company that developed and produced Internet of Things travel products. The brand launched a carry-on suitcase, the Bluesmart One, on the crowdfunding website Indiegogo in 2014. The campaign raised $2.2 million USD in contributions and became the highest crowdfunding project ever for a travel product at that time.

On May 1, 2018, Bluesmart Inc. announced they would be shutting down operations, due to a ban by major US airlines on smart luggage with non-removable batteries. The company's intellectual property was sold to Travelpro and the company's products will no longer be supported.

History

Crowdfunding campaign

In October 2014, the company launched its first product on Indiegogo, asking for support of their campaign - offering pre-orders of their product as rewards. The company met its goal in 2 hours and broke records in the Hardware category by pre-selling 10,000 units to 114 countries and collecting more than $2.2 million USD in contributions. In November 2014, while their extended Indiegogo campaign was still ongoing, the company was selected by Silicon Valley-based startup accelerator Y Combinator to be part of its program for the Winter 2015 batch.

Production of the first smart carry-On
After Bluesmart Inc.'s manufacturing prototype passed its first reliability tests in June 2015, they set up a Mass Production division and local team in China which quickly grew to 15 employees. Bluesmart Inc. began shipping what would be known as the Bluesmart One in August 2015.

Products

In late 2015, the brand released Bluesmart One.

In 2016, the brand released the premium Bluesmart Black Edition carry-on, which was more durable, and had an upgraded exterior anti-theft system. 

In June 2017, Bluesmart Inc. introduced its Series 2 products including the Bluesmart Cabin, Check, Laptop Bag and Passport Pouch. 

Bluesmart Inc. was awarded the Red Dot Best of the Best Design Award category.

See also
 Airbus Bag2Go, a similar concept announced in 2013
 Delsey, who have announced a similar product

References

External links
 

Internet of things
Indiegogo projects
Y Combinator companies
Luggage brands
American companies established in 2013
Technology companies established in 2013
Technology companies disestablished in 2018